William Gaggin (23 November 1847 – 5 July 1925) was an Australian cricketer. He played three first-class cricket matches for Victoria between 1869 and 1873. Gaggin also played Australian rules football for Melbourne Football Club and Carlton Football Club.

See also
 List of Victoria first-class cricketers

References

External links
 Demonwiki profile
 Blueseum profile

1847 births
1925 deaths
Australian cricketers
Victoria cricketers
Cricketers from County Cork
Melbourne Football Club (pre-VFA) players